Anavilis is a village in Vilnius district municipality, Lithuania. According to the 2011 census, it had population of 574. Anavilis is situated just outside Paberžė and together those two settlements function as (technically) one urban entity.

References

Villages in Vilnius County
Vilnius District Municipality